Galium murale is a species of flowering plant in the coffee family known by the common names small goosegrass, yellow wall bedstraw and tiny bedstraw. It is native to the Mediterranean Basin of southern Europe and northern Africa, and the Middle East from Turkey and the Caucasus east to Iran and south to Saudi Arabia and Somalia. It is also considered native to the Canary Islands, Madeira and the Azores. It is naturalised in Australia, New Zealand, Argentina, Chile and California.

Galium murale is an annual herb producing upright stems just a few centimeters long lined with whorls of 4 to 6 oval-shaped leaves not more than about 3 millimeters long each. Flowers appear singly or in pairs in the leaf axils. Each is about a millimeter wide and greenish to greenish-yellow. The fruit is a tiny nutlet coated in hooked hairs.

References

External links
Jepson Manual Treatment
Flora of Western Australia 
Photo gallery

murale
Flora of Europe
Flora of the Canary Islands
Flora of the Azores
Flora of Madeira
Flora of North Africa
Plants described in 1753
Taxa named by Carl Linnaeus